Annie Wu (born 1988) is an American comic book creator who has worked with DC Comics, Marvel Comics, and Vertigo (Comics). She has done work on Matt Fraction's Hawkeye and is a storyboard artist for Adult Swim's The Venture Bros.

Early life
Annie Wu grew up in central Florida and graduated magna cum laude from Maryland Institute College of Art in Baltimore, Maryland in 2010.

Career
Wu was the artist on the DC Comics series Black Canary that debuted in June 2015. Wu drew seven of the twelve issues that were published before the series' cancellation.

Bibliography

Archie Comics
Archie #4 (2015)

DC Comics
Batman Beyond Unlimited #18 (2013)
Batman Beyond: Batgirl Beyond (2014) 
Black Canary (ongoing) (2015)

Marvel Comics
Hawkeye (#14, #16, #19, #20, #21) (2013-2015)
Young Avengers #14 (2013)

Vertigo Comics
House of Mystery #41

References

External links
Annie Wu Official website
Creator Listing on DC Comics Website
Creator Listing on Marvel Comics Website

Living people
Maryland Institute College of Art alumni
American female comics artists
Artists from Florida
1988 births